Łukta  is a village in Ostróda County, Warmian-Masurian Voivodeship, in northern Poland. It is the seat of the gmina (administrative district) called Gmina Łukta. The village has a population of 1,000. It lies on the river Łukta.

The village is the location of a local road junction, where three voivodeship roads meet: the 527, 530 and 531.

From 1975 to 1998 Łukta was in Olsztyn Voivodeship.

The village has a football club Warmiak Łukta, a regional development foundation Fundacja Rozwoju Regionu Łukta, a church with churchyard and tower, restaurants, groceries and a dairy.

History 
The village was first mentioned in 1340, and given a charter (possibly not for the first time) in 1352. In 1414, at a time of wars, the village was destroyed by the Polish army. At that time four taverns, one mill and twelve households were burned down.

Historical buildings 
A Gothic church (since World War II dedicated to the Black Madonna of Częstochowa) was built in 1407; the tower was added in 1700. In the main altar there is a triptych from about 1580, with a sculpture of the Madonna made of wood. The pulpit dates from the 16th century. The church contains two 17th-century gravestones: that of Achatius von Borcke and his wife.

References

Villages in Ostróda County